The Beneš-Mráz Be-50 Beta-Minor was a light airplane manufactured in Czechoslovakia shortly before World War II.

Design and development
First flown in 1935, it was a low-wing cantilever monoplane of wooden construction, with tandem open cockpits and fixed tailwheel undercarriage.  The aircraft proved popular with Czechoslovakia's aeroclubs and was successful in international competitions.  In 1937, the designers created a modernised version, the Be-51, which featured a reduced wingspan and fully enclosed cockpits. A final variant, the Be-52 Beta-Major retained the Be-50's open cockpits but featured improved aerodynamics and a more powerful Walter Major engine.

Operational history
Like other Czechoslovakian aircraft, all available machines were impressed into Air Force service at the outbreak of war. Several Be-51s survived to be used by the Luftwaffe as liaison aircraft and trainers during the occupation.

In 2015, replica of Be-50 started operating. It crashed at airshow in August 2018, killing its pilot.

Variants
Be-50 Beta-MinorTandem open cockpits and  span wings.
Be-51 Beta-Minortandem seats in an enclosed cabin and  span wings.
Be-52 Beta-MajorStrengthened and more powerful two-seat aerobatic trainer, with  span wings.
Be-56 Beta-MajorStrengthened and more powerful single-seat aerobatic trainer, with  span wings.

Operators

Air Force of the Independent State of Croatia

Luftwaffe

Slovak Air Force (1939–45)

Specifications (Be-51 Beta-Minor)

Notes

References

 
 
 Němeček, V. (1968). Československá letadla. Praha: Naše Vojsko.

1930s Czechoslovakian sport aircraft
Beta-Minor
Single-engined tractor aircraft
Low-wing aircraft
Aircraft first flown in 1935